Merulempista oppositalis is a species of snout moth in the genus Merulempista. It was described by Francis Walker in 1863 and is known from the Asian to Australian regions.

References

Moths described in 1863
Phycitini